Fucophycidae is a subclass of Phaeophyceae (brown algae) which contains the most complex and evolved orders of Chromista algae. The members of this subclass have stalks with several morphological forms and distinct structures, characterized by an intercalary growth and a basic heteromorphic, sometimes secondarily iso- or sub-isomorphic life cycle.

                          Taxonomy
 Subclass Fucophycidae Cavalier-Smith 1986
 Order Ascoseirales Petrov1964 emend. Moe & Henry 1982
 Family Ascoseiraceae Skottsberg 1907
 Order Asterocladales T.Silberfeld et al. 2011
 Family Asterocladaceae Silberfeld et al. 2011
 Order Desmarestiales Setchell & Gardner 1925
 Family Arthrocladiaceae Chauvin 1842
 Family Desmarestiaceae (Thuret) Kjellman 1880
 Order Ectocarpales Bessey 1907 emend. Rousseau & Reviers 1999a [Chordariales Setchell & Gardner 1925; Dictyosiphonales Setchell & Gardner 1925; Scytosiphonales Feldmann 1949]
 Family Acinetosporaceae Hamel ex Feldmann 1937 [Pylaiellaceae; Pilayellaceae]
 Family Adenocystaceae Rousseau et al. 2000 emend. Silberfeld et al. 2011 [Chordariopsidaceae]
 Family Chordariaceae Greville 1830 emend. Peters & Ramírez 2001 [Myrionemataceae]
 Family Ectocarpaceae Agardh 1828 emend. Silberfeld et al. 2011
 Family Petrospongiaceae Racault et al. 2009
 Family Scytosiphonaceae Ardissone & Straforello 1877 [Chnoosporaceae Setchell & Gardner 1925]
 Order Fucales Bory de Saint-Vincent 1827 [Notheiales Womersley 1987; Durvillaeales Petrov 1965]
 Family Bifurcariopsidaceae Cho et al. 2006
 Family Durvillaeaceae (Oltmanns) De Toni 1891
 Family Fucaceae Adanson 1763
 Family Himanthaliaceae (Kjellman) De Toni 1891
 Family Hormosiraceae Fritsch 1945
 Family Notheiaceae Schmidt 1938
 Family Sargassaceae Kützing 1843 [Cystoseiraceae De Toni 1891]
 Family Seirococcaceae Nizamuddin 1987
 Family Xiphophoraceae Cho et al. 2006
 Order Laminariales Migula 1909 [Phaeosiphoniellales Silberfeld, Rousseau & Reviers 2014 ord. nov. prop.]
 Family Agaraceae Postels & Ruprecht 1840 [Costariaceae]
 Family Akkesiphycaceae Kawai & Sasaki 2000
 Family Alariaceae Setchell & Gardner 1925
 Family Aureophycaceae Kawai & Ridgway 2013
 Family Chordaceae Dumortier 1822
 Family Laminariaceae Bory de Saint-Vincent 1827 [Arthrothamnaceae Petrov 1974]
 Family Lessoniaceae Setchell & Gardner 1925
 Family Pseudochordaceae Kawai & Kurogi 1985
 Order Nemodermatales Parente et al. 2008
 Family Nemodermataceae Kuckuck ex Feldmann 1937
 Order Phaeosiphoniellales Silberfeld, Rousseau & Reviers 2014
 Family Phaeosiphoniellaceae Phillips et al. 2008
 Order Ralfsiales Nakamura ex Lim & Kawai 2007
 Family Mesosporaceae Tanaka & Chihara 1982
 Family Neoralfsiaceae Lim & Kawai 2007
 Family Ralfsiaceae Farlow 1881 [Heterochordariaceae Setchell & Gardner 1925]
 Order Scytothamnales Peters & Clayton 1998 emend. Silberfeld et al. 2011
 Family Asteronemataceae Silberfeld et al. 2011
 Family Bachelotiaceae Silberfeld et al. 2011
 Family Splachnidiaceae Mitchell & Whitting 1892 [Scytothamnaceae Womersley 1987]
 Order Sporochnales Sauvageau 1926
 Family Sporochnaceae Greville 1830
 Order Tilopteridales Bessey 1907 emend. Phillips et al. 2008 [Cutleriales Bessey 1907]
 Family Cutleriaceae Griffith & Henfrey 1856
 Family Halosiphonaceae Kawai & Sasaki 2000
 Family Phyllariaceae Tilden 1935
 Family Stschapoviaceae Kawai 2004
 Family Tilopteridaceae Kjellman 1890

References 

Brown algae